Chenaruiyeh (also Romanized as Chenārū’īyeh and Chenārūyeh; also known as Chanaroo’eyeh Ya’ghoob) is a village in Jorjafak Rural District, in the Central District of Zarand County, Kerman Province, Iran. At the 2006 census, its population was 13, in 5 families.

References 

Populated places in Zarand County